Canistrum is a genus of air-breathing land snails, terrestrial pulmonate gastropod mollusks in the family Bradybaenidae.

Species
Species within the genus Canistrum include:
 Canistrum balanoideum (Jonas, 1843)
 Canistrum ovoideum Bruguière, 1792
 Canistrum stabile (Sowerby, 1841)
 Canistrum velatum (Broderip, 1841)

References